Engineer Yerevan, are a professional basketball team formed in 2017, representing the National University of Architecture and Construction of Armenia.

History
Engineer Yerevan is one of the founding members of the Armenia Basketball League A.

Among seven teams, they occupied the seventh place at the end of the regular season of the inaugural 2017–18 season. However, advancing to the quarterfinals, they were eliminated after losing to Artik BC.

Season by season

Technical staff

References

Basketball teams in Armenia
2017 establishments in Armenia
Basketball teams established in 2017
Sport in Yerevan